Elliott Smith is the second studio album by American singer-songwriter Elliott Smith. It was recorded from late 1994 to early 1995, and released on July 21, 1995, through Kill Rock Stars, his first album on the label. It was preceded by the single "Needle in the Hay", released in early January 1995.

Background 

After being impressed by Smith, Mary Lou Lord invited him to tour with her, and helped him to sign to Kill Rock Stars.

Content 

The album is of a similar musical style to Roman Candle in its minimalist, acoustic folk sound. Smith mostly appears alone on his acoustic guitar, although he is occasionally backed up by the odd musical instrument, such as a harmonica and drums. Rolling Stone wrote of the album, "the music burrows, digging up gems of structure, melody and lyrical vividness that belie his naïve delivery [...] the sound is hummable pop, slowed and drugged, with tricky but unshowy guitar work driving the melodies forward".

The album's lyrics contain many references to drug use, which Smith claimed were merely metaphorical.

The album cover depicts two figures falling or jumping from a building. It is a xeroxed copy of a photograph taken by J.J. Gonson of a 1992 art installation at the former Museum of Modern Art at 17 Husova Street in Old Town, Prague. Gonson also photographed the cover for Roman Candle.

The lyrics also contain references to Portland's neighborhood Foster-Powell and Alphabet Historic District, St. Ides malt liquor and the borough of Queens in New York City.

The song "Clementine" is a reworking of the 19th century American western folk ballad "Oh My Darling, Clementine", which Smith would reference again in a later song, "Sweet Adeline", released in 1998 on XO.

The song "Christian Brothers" was also performed with Heatmiser in a full-band arrangement, recorded around the same time as the version featured on Elliott Smith; Heatmiser's version was released on the soundtrack of Heaven Adores You, a 2014 documentary about Smith's life and music.

Thematically, Smith said that he "personally can't get more dark" than his self-titled album.

Release 

"Needle in the Hay", the album's only single, was released in early January 1995.

Elliott Smith was released on July 21, 1995, through Kill Rock Stars, making it his first full-length album on the label. In contrast to Roman Candle, Elliott Smith was "promoted heavily", with posters of Smith appearing in the windows of record stores across the Northwest District of Portland, Oregon, where Smith lived at the time.

The album was reissued in an remastered and expanded 25th anniversary edition on August 28, 2020. The release also features a live album, Live at Umbra Penumbra, a 1994 performance at a Portland café, thought to be the earliest-known live recording of Smith performing as a solo artist. As part of the anniversary edition, J.J. Gonson, the artist behind the Elliott Smith album cover, released a 52-page coffee table book with handwritten lyrics, words from Smith's peers about the album's creation, and a series of previously unseen photographs. Gonson released a series of photo prints of Smith, one per month through August 2020, available for purchase through Morrison Hotel Gallery.

Of the reissue, Kill Rock Stars co-founder Slim Moon said:

Reception 

While not believed to have been reviewed by many, if any, critics at the time of its release, Elliott Smith has been critically well-received retrospectively. Steve Huey of AllMusic wrote "Elliott Smith contains the blueprint for his later successes, and more importantly, it's a fully-realized work itself." Trouser Press described it as "bleak, almost uncomfortably unsparing and yet tragically beautiful", and that "the songs, melodies, arrangements and production are all stronger and more fully realized than those on Roman Candle".

Legacy 

Pitchfork rated "Needle in the Hay" as the twenty-seventh best song of the 1990s. "Christian Brothers" has been covered by Queens of the Stone Age, with frontman Josh Homme emphasizing how much he loves the song.

Rolling Stone magazine described Smith as "ferociously talented", and the music as "some of the loveliest songs about the dissolution of a soul ever written [...] hypnotic and terribly, unrelentingly sad".

Pitchfork Media ranked the album #50 on their 2022 list of the best albums of the decade.

Track listing

Elliott Smith: Expanded 25th Anniversary Edition

Personnel 

 Elliott Smith – vocals, acoustic guitars, drums (2, 6, 9), electric guitar (6, 7, 10), tambourine (3), air organ (6), harmonica (8), cello (11)

 Additional personnel

 Neil Gust – electric guitar ("Single File"), sleeve photography
 Rebecca Gates – backing vocals ("St. Ides Heaven")

 Technical

 Leslie Uppinghouse – mixing assistance
 Tony Lash – mixing assistance
 J.J. Gonson – cover photography

References

External links 

 

1995 albums
Elliott Smith albums
Kill Rock Stars albums